Bothromegalopus is a genus of beetles in the family Megalopodidae, containing the following species:

 Bothromegalopus gibbosus (Pic, 1916)
 Bothromegalopus pilipes (Lacordaire, 1845)

References

Megalopodidae genera